Michael Milner may refer to:

Mike Milner (born 1939), English professional footballer
Michael Milner, 2nd Baron Milner of Leeds (1923–2003), British solicitor and politician